Dylan Alexis Romney (born 17 February 1996) is a French professional footballer who plays as a forward.

Club career
Romney started his career with Italian Serie A side Inter. In 2015, Romney was sent on loan to Savona in the Italian third tier, where he made five league appearances. On 14 October 2015, he debuted for Savona in a 2–1 loss to Maceratese. In 2016, Romney signed for French fifth tier club Paris FC B.

International career
He is eligible to represent the United States.

References

External links
 

1996 births
Living people
People from Gonesse
French people of American descent
French footballers
Footballers from Val-d'Oise
Association football forwards
Inter Milan players
Savona F.B.C. players
JA Drancy players
Serie C players
Championnat National 3 players
Championnat National 2 players
French expatriate footballers
French expatriate sportspeople in Italy
Expatriate footballers in Italy